Kuop or Neoch is an atoll in the state of Chuuk, Federated States of Micronesia. Its area of 0.5 km2 is uninhabited.

Geography
The atoll is 21.5 km in length with a maximum width of 8 km and is located only 3 km to the south of Chuuk atoll's southernmost point.

Islands
There are 2 small islands and two islets with a total area of 0.5 km2 on its reef. Givry, also known as Feneppi, the largest island, is located at the northern end of the atoll. Kuop is uninhabited; administratively it belongs to Uman municipality.

History
Kuop was believed to have been discovered by Spanish navigator Alonso de Arellano in 1565.

At the time of World War II during Operation Hailstone on February 4, 1944, the  ran aground on Kuop Atoll's reef and later sank.

As a desert island, Kuop is officially the largest marine protected area in Micronesia and continues to be right up to the present day.

References

External links 
Atoll Research Bulletin No 155

Atolls of the Federated States of Micronesia
Islands of Chuuk State